Edward Patrick Drohan (17 July 1876 – 28 July 1938) was an Australian rules footballer who played for the Fitzroy Football Club and Collingwood Football Club in the Victorian Football League (VFL) before becoming an umpire and a coach.

Drohan made his debut for Fitzroy in 1898 and played in their premiership side that year and the following season. In both Grand Finals he played on a wing, the position he occupied for most of his career. 

At the end of the 1899 season, in the process of naming his own "champion player", the football correspondent for The Argus ("Old Boy"), selected a team of the best players of the 1899 VFL competition:Backs: Maurie Collins (Essendon), Bill Proudfoot (Collingwood), Peter Burns (Geelong); Halfbacks: Pat Hickey (Fitzroy), George Davidson (South Melbourne), Alf Wood (Melbourne); Centres: Fred Leach (Collingwood), Firth McCallum (Geelong), Harry Wright (Essendon); Wings: Charlie Pannam (Collingwood), Eddie Drohan (Fitzroy), Herb Howson (South Melbourne); Forwards: Bill Jackson (Essendon), Eddy James (Geelong), Charlie Colgan (South Melbourne); Ruck: Mick Pleass (South Melbourne), Frank Hailwood (Collingwood), Joe McShane (Geelong); Rovers: Dick Condon (Collingwood), Bill McSpeerin (Fitzroy), Teddy Rankin (Geelong).From those he considered to be the three best players — that is, Condon, Hickey, and Pleass — he selected Pat Hickey as his "champion player" of the season. ('Old Boy', "Football: A Review of the Season", (Monday, 18 September 1899), p.6).

Drohan crossed to Collingwood in 1903 and finished the season as a member of another premiership winning side, becoming the first person to play in a VFL/AFL premiership for two different sides.

After retiring in 1908 Drohan spent a couple of years as a field umpire before joining Melbourne as coach in 1910. He had little success, winning just four games for the season and in 1911 he was chosen to coach St Kilda. Again his side struggled, this time winning just two games. Later Drohan also acted as a goal umpire and a steward.

References

Sources
 Atkinson, G. (1982) Everything you ever wanted to know about Australian rules football but couldn't be bothered asking, The Five Mile Press: Melbourne. .

External links

Coaching record from AFL Tables

1876 births
Collingwood Football Club players
Collingwood Football Club Premiership players
Fitzroy Football Club players
Fitzroy Football Club Premiership players
Melbourne Football Club coaches
St Kilda Football Club coaches
Australian rules footballers from Victoria (Australia)
Australian Football League umpires
1938 deaths
Three-time VFL/AFL Premiership players